Aurore Kichenin (born 23 January 1995) is a French model and beauty pageant titleholder who was the 1st Runner-Up at Miss France 2017 and represented France at Miss World 2017 in Sanya, after being Miss Lanquedoc 2016

Aurore is active on social media and has a fame with her comedy Instagram stories. Recently, she started some collaborations and stream arts/painting contents.

Pageantry

Miss France 2017
Kichenin began her pageantry career in 2014, when she was crowned Miss Palavas 2014. She later was crowned Miss Montpellier 2016 and was given the right to compete in the Miss Languedoc-Roussillon 2016 competition.

On 6 August 2016, she went on to be crowned Miss Languedoc-Roussillon 2016 in Carnon and received the right to represent Languedoc-Roussillon in Miss France 2017.
On 17 December 2016 she competed at Miss France 2017 where she placed 1st Runner-Up.

Miss World 2017
Aurore represented France at Miss World 2017 in Sanya, China where she placed in the Top 5. She was Top 30 in the Top Model competition and Top 20 in the Beauty with a Purpose competition.

Politics 
In 2021, Kichenin stood as a candidate in the 2021 French regional elections in Occitanie for The Republicans political party on the electoral list of Aurélien Pradié.

Family and Origins 
She has Indian origins and has a sister Anaïs Kichenin who is also a French model and independent comedian.

Aurore Kichenin was born on January 28, 1995, in Clamart in the Hauts-de-Seine department then resides in Jacou, near Montpellier. She has Malbaraise = Indian origins through her father, and Polish by her mother. 

In 2016, she obtained a BTS Tourisme at the Lycée hôtelier Georges-Frêche in Montpellier. During her preparation for the Miss France 2017 election, she continued her training with a 3rd year of studies in Applied Foreign Languages, where she specialized in Portuguese. Then resides in Castelnau-le-Lez, between Jacou and Montpellier.

Works 
Aurore worked for big modeling agency as Unik Scouting and some luxury brand like Orza Luxury Swimwear Paris.

She participate on World Diabete Day program in 2020 with the team of Les Képis Pescalunes and some other works as ambassador of Téléthon 2020

References

External links
  Official site

1995 births
Living people
French beauty pageant winners
French female models
Miss World 2017 delegates
French people of Polish descent
French people of Indian descent
Beauty queen-politicians